{
  "type": "FeatureCollection",
  "features": [
    {
      "type": "Feature",
      "properties": {},
      "geometry": {
        "type": "Point",
        "coordinates": [
          81.112747192383,
          6.6693815775734
        ]
      }
    }
  ]
}
West Watta is a village in Sri Lanka. It is located within Central Province, slightly southeast. The A2 road runs through the village; it is close to the Kinkini Wehera Raja Maha Viharaya Buddhist Temple and next to the Kirindi Oya River.

See also
List of towns in Central Province, Sri Lanka

External links

Populated places in Matale District